HD 126053 is the Henry Draper Catalogue designation for a star in the equatorial constellation of Virgo. It has an apparent magnitude of 6.25, which means it is faintly visible to the naked eye. According to the Bortle scale, it requires dark suburban or rural skies to view. Parallax measurements made by the Hipparcos spacecraft provide an estimated distance of 57 light years to this star. It is drifting closer with a heliocentric radial velocity of −19.2 km/s.

This star is considered a solar analog—meaning that it is photometrically analogous to the Sun. The physical properties of this star are similar to the Sun, although it is metal poor. Like the Sun, it has a magnetic activity cycle. It shares a common proper motion through space with the spectroscopic binary star system HD 122742, and in the past the three may have formed a triple star system. In the Bright Star Catalogue, it was noted as having an infrared excess. This may have been accreted from the HD 122742 system when the three stars were closer to each other.

In 2012, a brown dwarf was discovered orbiting this star at a distance of 2630 AU.

References 

G-type main-sequence stars
Solar analogs
Brown dwarfs

Virgo (constellation)
5384
Durchmusterung objects
0547
Virginis, 243
126053
070319